Gabriela Montero (born May 10, 1970) is a Venezuelan pianist, known in particular for her real-time improvisation of complex musical pieces on themes suggested by her audience and other sources, as well as for performances of standard classical repertoire.

Biography 
Born in Caracas, Venezuela, of an American-born mother and a Venezuelan father,  Montero was seven months old when her parents introduced her to the piano. She used her right index finger to play individual notes. When she was fifteen months old, her parents noticed she was picking out a familiar tune on the little piano. Three months later, before she could speak, she had picked out the melody of the National Anthem.

Montero began formal piano lessons at age four and gave her first public performance at the age of five. Aged eight, she made her concerto debut at the National Theater in Caracas, performing the complete Haydn D Major Piano Concerto with the Orquesta Nacional Juvenil de Venezuela (National Youth Orchestra of Venezuela), conducted by José Antonio Abreu. At the age of nine, she was awarded a government scholarship to study in the US. From 1990 until 1993, she studied at the Royal Academy of Music in London with Hamish Milne. In 1995, she won third prize at the XIII International Chopin Piano Competition.

Concerts 
In both recital and after performing a concerto, Montero often invites her audience to participate in asking for a melody for improvisations. At times, also the orchestra may suggest a theme. "When improvising," Montero says, "I connect to my audience in a completely unique way – and they connect with me. Because improvisation is such a huge part of who I am, it is the most natural and spontaneous way I can express myself. I have been improvising since my hands first touched the keyboard, but for many years I kept this aspect of my playing secret."

Montero has performed with the New York Philharmonic; debuted with Lorin Maazel, Los Angeles Philharmonic at the Hollywood Bowl; Philharmonia Orchestra at the Royal Festival Hall; Rotterdam Philharmonisch Orkest at De Doelen; and NDR Hanover at the Bergen Festival.  In recital, her engagements include the Edinburgh Festival, Vienna Konzerthaus, Klavier-Festival Ruhr, Kölner Philharmonie, Tonhalle Düsseldorf, Konzerthaus Berlin, Alte Sendersaal Frankfurt, Kennedy Centre Washington, D.C., and at the ‘Progetto Martha Argerich’ Festival in Lugano where she is invited annually.

Montero performed John Williams' "Air and Simple Gifts" with Itzhak Perlman, Yo-Yo Ma, and Anthony McGill  at the inauguration of U.S. president Barack Obama on January 20, 2009, although the music played was a recording made two days beforehand because of concerns over the cold weather damaging the instruments.

Montero has a partnership with the French cellist Gautier Capuçon, appearing at various European festivals.

Awards for CD releases 

Montero's first CD release consisted of one disc of music by Rachmaninov, Chopin, and Liszt, and a second of improvisations. Her CD Bach and Beyond contains improvisations on Bach themes, and topped the charts for several months. In February 2008, her follow-up recording of improvisations, Baroque, received 5-star reviews from BBC Music Magazine and Classic FM.

Montero's Bach and Beyond was given the "Choc de la musique de l'année" award in 2006 from the French magazine Le Monde de la musique. She also received the Keyboard Instrumentalist of the Year award at the ECHO Preis Award in Munich. In 2007, ECHO Preis awarded her the Klassik-ohne-Grenzen Award for her Bach and Beyond CD. In 2009, her album Baroque was nominated for a Grammy Award in two categories (Best Crossover Category and Best Producer Category). A more recent album (2015) - featuring her own composition for piano and orchestra "Ex Patria", Rachmaninov's Piano Concerto No.2, and 3 freestyle improvisations - won the Grammy for Best Classical Album at the 2015 Latin Grammy Awards. She has also been profiled on CBS's 60 Minutes in a segment entitled "The Gift".

Compositions
 Op. 1, "Ex Patria", for piano and orchestra
 Piano Concerto No. 1, "Latin Concerto"

Discography
 Gabriela Montero: Montero: Piano Concerto No. 1; Ravel: Piano Concerto in G Major, M.83 (Orchid Classics, 2019)
 Gabriela Montero: Rachmaninov: Piano Concerto No. 2, Op. 18; Montero: Ex Patria, Op. 1 & Improvisations (Orchid Classics, 2015)
 Gabriela Montero: Solatino (EMI Classics, 2010)
 Gautier Capuçon and Gabriela Montero: Rhapsody - Rachmaninov, Prokofiev Cello Sonatas (Virgin Classics, 2008)
 Gabriela Montero: Baroque (EMI Classics, 2007)
 Gabriela Montero: Bach and Beyond (EMI Classics, 2006)
 Gabriela Montero: Piano Recital (EMI Classics, 2005)
 Gabriela Montero: Gabriela Montero en Concert a Montreal (Palexa, 2006)
 Gabriela Montero: Chopin: Piano Works (Palexa, 2007)
 Clara - Robert - Johannes: Darlings of the Muses: Piano Concerto in A minor (Clara Schumann) (Analekta, 2020)

References

External links
 Gabriela Montero official website

Venezuelan classical pianists
Venezuelan women pianists
Women classical pianists
Prize-winners of the International Chopin Piano Competition
Alumni of the Royal Academy of Music
Musical improvisation
Musicians from Caracas
1970 births
Living people
21st-century women pianists